Earlington is an unincorporated community in Franconia Township in Montgomery County, Pennsylvania, United States. Earlington is located at the intersection of Allentown Road and Morwood Road. The Pinball Parlour is located on Allentown Road in Earlington.

References

Unincorporated communities in Montgomery County, Pennsylvania
Unincorporated communities in Pennsylvania